HY or Hy may refer to:

 Hy, a Lisp dialect for Python
 HY (band), a Japanese band
 Hy (island), a pre-Christian and early Christian name for the Scottish island Iona
 Hy (name), a given name, nickname, or surname
 HY (satellite), a  series of Chinese marine remote sensing satellites

Other uses
 hy, the ISO 639-1 language code for the Armenian language
 HY, the IATA code for Uzbekistan Airways, the national airline of Uzbekistan
 H-Y antigen, a male tissue specific antigen
 HY Velorum, a binary star system
 HY-80, a type of alloy steel
 HY-124798, a chemistry compound
 Hy-V, a flight experiment research project
 HY1935 bayonet, a Chinese infantry weapon

See also
 HI (disambiguation)
 High (disambiguation)